SilkyMail was a commercial webmail client marketed by Cyrusoft from approximately 1999 to 2005.  As of October 1, 2005, Cyrusoft International, Inc./ISAMET, has declared Chapter 7 bankruptcy and gone out of business.

SilkyMail was a browser-based alternative to Cyrusoft's primary e-mail client Mulberry.  It was based on the popular Horde IMP webmail package, but it added unique features like LDAP and IMSP and was more polished and easier to set up at the time, due to the way it was packaged.  It was marketed as "the smoothest mail client in a browser around".  Its source code was available for free under GPL, however the package was sold at "prices as low as pennies per user", and site support packages were offered starting at $500 per site.

References

 

Companies that have filed for Chapter 7 bankruptcy